The Østfold Workers' Sports Association (often abbreviated to Østfold AIK), founded 23 October 1927, was a sporting association from Østfold in Norway. It was one of many regional associations within the Workers Federation of Sports (AIF).

Member clubs of  Østfold AIK
Within the Østfold AIK there were many clubs:

Football
In football, Østfold AIK was the leading club within the AIF. Two Østfold teams, Sprint and Sparta, won 9 of the 16 AIF national football championships held between 1924 and 1939.

Østfold AIK occasionally selected a combined football team to play international matches, such as 27 August 1937 when they played the Basque Country.

Post World War 2
In 1945 Østfold Workers' Sports Association merged with Østfold Distriktslag for Idrett to form Østfold Idrettskrets.

Club Chairmen

Ola Johan Brandstorp (1927–1929) 
Thorstein Guldberg, Borgen (1931) 
Hermod Arnulf, Sparta (1933–1934) 
Hans Thorvaldsen, Sarpsborg (1935–1936)
Torkil Samuelsen, Moss (1937–1939)

References

Sports governing bodies in Norway
Red Sport International
Sports organizations established in 1927